Cinioch, named Cínaed mac Luchtren in the Irish Annals, was king of the Picts, in modern Scotland, from circa 616 to 631, when his death is reported in the Annals of Ulster, the Annals of Tigernach and the Chronicon Scotorum.

According to the Pictish Chronicle king lists, he reigned for 14 or 19 years and was followed by Gartnait III.

References
 Anderson, Alan Orr, Early Sources of Scottish History A.D 500–1286, volume 1. Reprinted with corrections. Paul Watkins, Stamford, 1990.

External links
CELT: Corpus of Electronic Texts at University College Cork includes the Annals of Ulster, Tigernach, the Four Masters and Innisfallen, the Chronicon Scotorum, the Lebor Bretnach (which includes the Duan Albanach), Genealogies, and various Saints' Lives. Most are translated into English, or translations are in progress.

Pictish Chronicle

631 deaths
Pictish monarchs
7th-century Scottish monarchs
Year of birth unknown